Stefán Jóhann Stefánsson (20 July 1894 – 20 October 1980) was the first actual minister of Foreign Affairs in Iceland from 18 November 1941 to 17 January 1942. He was prime minister of Iceland from 4 February 1947 to 6 December 1949. He was first elected to the Althing in 1934 but did not get reelected in 1937. From 1942 to 1953, he regained his seat in the Althing. He was chairman of the now defunct Social Democratic Party (Alþýðuflokkurinn) from 1938 to 1952. He was ambassador of Iceland in Denmark from 1957 to 1965.

He was minister for social affairs from 1939 to 1941 and Minister of Foreign and Social Affairs from 1941 to 1942. He was Prime-Minister when Island joined NATO in 1949.

He was born in Dagverðareyri, Iceland, to Stefán Ágúst Oddsson and Ólöf Árnadóttir. Stefán gained his degree in Law in 1922. He was Social Affairs Minister in 1939 and Secretary of State in 1940–1942.

Stefán died in a hospital in Reykjavík on 20 October 1980.

References

External links
CV in Icelandic

1894 births
1980 deaths
Prime Ministers of Iceland
Social Affairs ministers of Iceland
Ambassadors of Iceland to Denmark
Ambassadors of Iceland to Turkey
Members of the Althing
Social Democratic Party (Iceland) politicians